Mutthigunj is a locality/township of Allahabad, Uttar Pradesh, India

Neighbourhoods in Allahabad
Villages in Allahabad district